C. moluccensis  may refer to:
 Cacatua moluccensis, the salmon-crested cockatoo or Moluccan cockatoo, a parrot species endemic to south Moluccas in eastern Indonesia
 Centrophorus moluccensis, the smallfin gulper shark, a deepwater shark species
 Conus moluccensis, a sea snail species

See also
 Moluccensis